Bill Mason was a Canadian naturalist, author, artist, filmmaker, and conservationist, noted primarily for his popular canoeing books, films, and art as well as his documentaries on wolves. Mason was also known for including passages from Christian sermons in his films. He was born in 1929 in Winnipeg, Manitoba, and graduated from the University of Manitoba School of Art in 1951.  He developed and refined canoeing strokes and river-running techniques, especially for complex whitewater situations. Mason canoed all of his adult life, ranging widely over the wilderness areas of Canada and the United States.  Termed a "wilderness artist," Mason left a legacy that includes books, films, and artwork on canoeing and nature. His daughter Becky  and son Paul are also both canoeists and artists. Mason died of cancer in 1988.

Canoeing

In his review of James Raffan's 1996 biography of Mason, Michael Peake refers to Mason as "the patron saint of canoeing." To many Canadian and American paddlers and canoeists growing up in the 1970s and 1980s, his series of instructional films were the introduction to technique and the canoeing experience. In many ways, Bill, Joyce, Paul, and Becky Mason were the "faces" of Canadian canoeing in the 1970s. Mason's good friend, filmmaker Blake James, also frequently appeared in his films.

Although he used a variety of Chestnut models in his films, including the "Pal", his favourite boat was a red "Fort" Chestnut Prospector, a 16-foot canvas covered wood canoe that he claimed was the most versatile design ever manufactured, in spite of the popularity of more modern construction techniques and materials.  After his death, this canoe was donated to the Canadian Canoe Museum in Peterborough, Ontario, where it is on display. His wife, Joyce, and children, Paul and Becky, frequently travelled with him and contributed to his later books and films, and have continued his life work and environmentalism.

Honours

Mason won several honours, including being featured on a Canadian postage stamp in 1998. After his death, a warden at Nahanni National Park Reserve informally started calling the dramatic rock spire, in the midst of Virginia Falls, "Mason's Rock".  This usage appears to have become widespread, although it has not yet been made official. His films can be viewed for free on the internet through the website of the National Film Board of Canada.

The Ottawa-Carleton District School Board has memorialized Mason with a "72 acre outdoor classroom on the west side of the City of Ottawa which its primary focus to provide an opportunity to Ottawa-Carleton District School Board (OCDSB) and non-OCDSB students to explore, experience, appreciate and learn about natural science and outdoor activities in an outdoor setting."

Works by Bill Mason

Books
Path of the Paddle , on the technique of Canadian style canoeing
Song of the Paddle  , on wilderness canoe travel
Canoescapes - a compilation of text and his paintings

Films
Quetico (1958) - a young Bill Mason paddles in Quetico Provincial Park in a short Christopher Chapman production
Wilderness Treasure (1962) - won a Canadian Film Award in the category of Travel and Recreation in 1963
The Voyageurs (1964)
Paddle to the Sea (1966) - nominated for Best Short Film, 1968 Academy Awards
The Rise and Fall of the Great Lakes (1968)
Blake (1969) - on the passion of flying, about his friend, fellow filmmaker and pilot Blake James, nominated Best Live Action Short Film, 1970 Academy Awards
Death of a Legend (1971) - a documentary on the threats to wolves
Cry of the Wild (1972) - a film on timber and Arctic wolves
Goldwood (1974) A journey to a past family homestead on a now deserted island.
In Search of the Bowhead Whale (1974) - adventure film of a whaling expedition
Wolf Pack (1974) - a short film on wolf pack interrelationships, including among wolves the Mason family kept on their own property.
Face of the Earth (1975)
Path of the Paddle (1977) - a series of films on the techniques of canoeing
Song of the Paddle (1978) - a film of one of Bill Mason's family wilderness canoeing trips—Canadian Film Awards 1978 (Best Direction, Best Cinematography in Documentary under 60 Minutes, Best Sound Editing)
Coming Back Alive (1980) - an instructional film on recreational boating safety
Pukaskwa National Park (1983) - a film covering one of Mason's favourite areas, the Pukaskwa region of Lake Superior.
The Land that Devours Ships (1984)
Waterwalker (1984) - a feature-length film of Bill Mason's journey on Lake Superior

Sources 
Buck, K. 2005. Bill Mason: Wilderness Artist From Heart to Hand. Rocky Mountain Books. 
Mason, P. The Thrill of the Paddle 
Raffan, J.  1996. Fire in the Bones, Bill Mason and the Canadian Canoeing Tradition. Toronto: Harper Collins

References

External links 

Fire In the Bones
Biographical Summary
All of Bill Mason's films at NFB.ca
Watch Bill Mason's films in "Beyond the wild, beyond the paddle," NFB.ca
Information on the Chestnut Canoe Co. from dragonflycanoe.com

1929 births
1988 deaths
BAFTA winners (people)
Canadian environmentalists
Canadian documentary film directors
20th-century Canadian non-fiction writers
Film directors from Winnipeg
Writers from Winnipeg
Deaths from cancer in Quebec
Canadian male canoeists
Canadian naturalists
People from Outaouais
Christian writers
National Film Board of Canada people
20th-century naturalists
20th-century Canadian male writers
Canadian male non-fiction writers